Sergey Viktorovich Shustikov (30 September 1970 – 7 January 2016) was a Russian football coach and player who managed FC Solyaris Moscow from 2014 until his death. He was the son of Viktor Shustikov and the father of Sergey Shustikov.

International career
Shustikov made his debut for CIS on 2 February 1992 in a friendly against the United States.

References

External links
La Liga Stats. 

1970 births
2016 deaths
Soviet footballers
Soviet Union international footballers
Russian footballers
Russian expatriate footballers
Expatriate footballers in Spain
FC Torpedo Moscow players
FC Torpedo-2 players
Soviet Top League players
Russian Premier League players
La Liga players
Racing de Santander players
PFC CSKA Moscow players
CA Osasuna players
FC Moscow players
Association football midfielders
Russian football managers